The third season of the American television series The Flash, which is based on the DC Comics character Barry Allen / Flash, a costumed superhero crime-fighter with the power to move at super speeds, follows Barry as he deals with the consequences of his decision to save his mother, which creates "Flashpoint", and the resulting emergence of a new foe in Savitar. It is set in the Arrowverse, sharing continuity with the other television series of the universe, and is a spin-off of Arrow. The season was produced by Berlanti Productions, Warner Bros. Television, and DC Entertainment, with Andrew Kreisberg, Aaron and Todd Helbing serving as showrunners.

The season was ordered in March 2016, and production began that July, lasting until April 2017. Alongside Grant Gustin, who reprises his role as Barry Allen, principal cast members Candice Patton, Danielle Panabaker, Carlos Valdes, Keiynan Lonsdale, Tom Cavanagh, and Jesse L. Martin return from the second season.

The first episode of the season premiered on The CW on October 4, 2016, and was watched by 3.17 million people, with the season consisting of 23 episodes. The series was renewed for a fourth season on January 8, 2017.

Episodes

Cast and characters

Main 
 Grant Gustin as Barry Allen / Flash and Savitar 
 Candice Patton as Iris West 
 Danielle Panabaker as Caitlin Snow / Killer Frost 
 Carlos Valdes as Cisco Ramon / Vibe 
 Keiynan Lonsdale as Wally West / Kid Flash 
 Tom Cavanagh as Harry Wells and H.R. Wells
 Jesse L. Martin as Joe West

Recurring 
 John Wesley Shipp as Henry Allen and Jay Garrick / Flash
 Tom Felton as Julian Albert / Doctor Alchemy
 Tobin Bell voices Doctor Alchemy and Savitar
 Violett Beane as Jesse Chambers Wells / Jesse Quick
 Danielle Nicolet as Cecile Horton
 Andre Tricoteux as Savitar
 Jessica Camacho as Gypsy
 Anne Dudek as Tracy Brand

Guest

Production

Development 
In March 2016, The CW president Mark Pedowitz announced that The Flash was renewed for a third season, which was initially reported to be given a 22-episode order. However, writer Brian Ford Sullivan clarified that August that there would be 23 episodes. Andrew Kreisberg, Aaron and Todd Helbing served as the season's showrunners, while Zack Stentz, who wrote the season 2 episode "The Runaway Dinosaur", joined as consulting producer. He announced his exit from the series on February 1, 2017, and Aaron Helbing left in May 2017.

Writing 

In June 2016, Grant Gustin confirmed that the season premiere would be titled "Flashpoint" and adapt elements from the comics storyline of the same name which showed Barry Allen traveling back in time to save his mother from being murdered, creating a new timeline in the process, though he later noted that "We're definitely doing this [Flashpoint] thing our own way…. This will be its own thing." Gustin also revealed that the "Flashpoint" timeline of the series would not last for all of the third season, but that there would be "permanent ramifications".

Casting 

Main cast members Grant Gustin, Candice Patton, Danielle Panabaker, Carlos Valdes, Jesse L. Martin, and Keiynan Lonsdale returned from previous seasons as Barry Allen / The Flash, Iris West, Caitlin Snow, Cisco Ramon, Joe West, and Wally West, respectively. Gustin also portrayed Savitar, the season's Big Bad. Tom Cavanagh also returned as a regular, portraying the Harrison Wells of Earth-19 who goes by "H.R". He also portrayed, in a less prominent capacity, "Harry" Wells of Earth-2, and several parallel universe versions of Wells as cameos: a hillbilly from an unspecified Earth, the Wells of Earth-17, and a French-speaking mime artist from another Earth. Tom Felton joined the cast as Julian Albert, a fellow crime-scene investigator at the Central City Police Department. The character was originally known as Julian Dorn, and serves as the series' version of Doctor Alchemy.

Rick Cosnett, who played Eddie Thawne as a regular during season 1, was confirmed to make a guest appearance in the second part of the season, with no additional details given about his return. He was later revealed to be playing the Speed Force's manifestation of Eddie.

Design 
Practical effects and costume for Savitar were created by Legacy Effects. Kreisberg noted, "The suit's body lights were all practical, which I think was actually one of the hardest parts of the process. One light would go out and...Oh God, we'd be screwed!" The Killer Frost costume seen in the third season differs substantially from that seen in season two; while the earlier version was simply leather pants and a jacket, this one includes fishnets, thigh-high boots and a cape. The season introduces Wally West as Kid Flash, and the costume was designed to look exactly as in the comics. The Flash costume of the Barry Allen from 2024 was designed to look more sleek and form fitting than the present Barry's costume, and additionally features a more prominent yellow belt.

Filming 
Production for the season began on July 6, 2016 in Vancouver. The episode "The Once and Future Flash" marked Tom Cavanagh's return to directing after a decade; he previously directed three episodes of the TV series Ed (2000–2004). Production concluded on April 22, 2017.

Music 
All music composed by Blake Neely.

Arrowverse tie-ins 

During the third season, The Flash was a part of the "Invasion!" crossover event with Arrow and Legends of Tomorrow. The event also saw Melissa Benoist reprising her role as Kara Danvers / Supergirl from Supergirl. Andrea Brooks, who plays Eve Teschmacher on Supergirl, briefly reprised her role in the episode "Dead or Alive". The Supergirl episode "Star-Crossed" ends with Music Meister (Darren Criss) hypnotizing Kara on Earth-38 and fleeing to Earth-1 to do the same to Barry, thus initiating the events of The Flash season 3 episode "Duet". Benoist returned as Kara, as did Supergirl regulars Chris Wood, David Harewood and Jeremy Jordan, along with Legends of Tomorrow regular Victor Garber and former Arrow regular John Barrowman.

Marketing 
In July 2016, members of the cast as well as executive producers Todd Helbing and Aaron Helbing attended San Diego Comic-Con to promote the season, where the first trailer for the season was released. The trailer showed first footage of Lonsdale as Kid Flash, The Rival, and Doctor Alchemy. A teaser promo titled "Time Strikes Back" was released on August 23, 2016, featuring John Wesley Shipp as Jay Garrick talking to Barry. The official poster for the season was released on September 20, 2016 starring Grant Gustin as Barry Allen sporting The Flash's iconic bright red suit with the tagline: "New Destinies. New Dangers."

In September 2016, The CW released the promo "Superhero Fight Club 2.0" to promote the start of the 2016–17 season with the addition of Supergirl to their lineup, as well as their new mobile app, where the promo could exclusively be viewed initially. The new Superhero Fight Club sees Green Arrow, Flash, Atom, Firestorm, White Canary and Supergirl go up against a new fight simulator created by Cisco Ramon and Felicity Smoak, while Diggle and Martian Manhunter observe. After defeating the simulator, Cisco releases Grodd into the arena for the heroes to face.

The analytics firm ListenFirst Media determined The Flash garnered the seventh most user engagement among broadcast shows, with 7.52 million total engagements from May 1 to August 30, 2016. ListenFirst analyzed fan growth, responses and conversation volume across Facebook, Instagram, Tumblr and Google+.

Release

Broadcast 
The season began airing on October 4, 2016, on The CW in the United States, and on CTV in Canada, before moving to CTV Two on February 28, 2017. The season ended on May 23, 2017.

Home media 
In October 2016, it was announced that the season would be available for streaming on Netflix eight days after the season finale, part of the new CW-Netflix deal. The five most recent episodes are available to stream for free on the new mobile CW app, instead of on Hulu like the previous two seasons. The season began streaming on Netflix on May 31, 2017, and was released on Blu-ray and DVD in Region 1 on September 5, 2017.

Reception

Ratings 
{{Television episode ratings
| title    = The Flash season 3

| title1   = Flashpoint
| date1    = October 4, 2016
| rs1      = 1.3/5
| viewers1 = 3.17
| dvr1     = 0.8
| dvrv1    = 1.89
| total1   = 2.1
| totalv1  = 5.06

| title2   = Paradox
| date2    = October 11, 2016
| rs2      = 1.1/4
| viewers2 = 2.80
| dvr2     = 0.7
| dvrv2    = 1.92
| total2   = 1.8
| totalv2  = 4.72

| title3   = Magenta
| date3    = October 18, 2016
| rs3      = 1.0/4
| viewers3 = 2.67
| dvr3     = 0.9
| dvrv3    = 2.00
| total3   = 1.9
| totalv3  = 4.67

| title4   = The New Rogues
| date4    = October 25, 2016
| rs4      = 1.0/3
| viewers4 = 2.80
| dvr4     = 0.9
| dvrv4    = 1.91
| total4   = 1.9
| totalv4  = 4.71

| title5   = Monster
| date5    = November 1, 2016
| rs5      = 1.0/3
| viewers5 = 2.77
| dvr5     = 0.9
| dvrv5    = 2.01
| total5   = 1.9
| totalv5  = 4.78

| title6   = Shade
| date6    = November 15, 2016
| rs6      = 1.2/4
| viewers6 = 3.01
| dvr6     = 0.9
| dvrv6    = 2.06
| total6   = 2.1
| totalv6  = 5.07

| title7   = Killer Frost
| date7    = November 22, 2016
| rs7      = 1.1/4
| viewers7 = 2.95
| dvr7     = 0.8
| dvrv7    = 1.99
| total7   = 1.9
| totalv7  = 4.93

| title8   = Invasion!
| date8    = November 29, 2016
| rs8      = 1.5/5
| viewers8 = 4.15
| dvr8     = 0.9
| dvrv8    = 2.17
| total8   = 2.4
| totalv8  = 6.31

| title9   = The Present
| date9    = December 6, 2016
| rs9      = 1.2/4
| viewers9 = 3.14
| dvr9     = 0.8
| dvrv9    = 1.80
| total9   = 2.0
| totalv9  = 4.94

| title10   = Borrowing Problems From the Future
| date10    = January 24, 2017
| rs10      = 1.0/3
| viewers10 = 2.72
| dvr10     = 0.8
| dvrv10    = 1.92
| total10   = 1.8
| totalv10  = 4.64

| title11   = Dead or Alive
| date11    = January 31, 2017
| rs11      = 1.1/4
| viewers11 = 3.06
| dvr11     = 0.7
| dvrv11    = 1.64
| total11   = 1.8
| totalv11  = 4.71

| title12   = Untouchable
| date12    = February 7, 2017
| rs12      = 1.1/4
| viewers12 = 2.91
| dvr12     = 0.7
| dvrv12    = 1.68
| total12   = 1.8
| totalv12  = 4.59

| title13   = Attack on Gorilla City
| date13    = February 21, 2017
| rs13      = 1.0/4
| viewers13 = 2.78
| dvr13     = 0.9
| dvrv13    = 1.96
| total13   = 1.9
| totalv13  = 4.75

| title14   = Attack on Central City
| date14    = February 28, 2017
| rs14      = 1.1/4
| viewers14 = 2.87
| dvr14     = 0.8
| dvrv14    = 1.81
| total14   = 1.9
| totalv14  = 4.68

| title15   = The Wrath of Savitar
| date15    = March 7, 2017
| rs15      = 0.9/3
| viewers15 = 2.52
| dvr15     = 0.7
| dvrv15    = 1.71
| total15   = 1.6
| totalv15  = 4.23

| title16   = Into the Speed Force
| date16    = March 14, 2017
| rs16      = 0.9/3
| viewers16 = 2.39
| dvr16     = 0.7
| dvrv16    = 1.70
| total16   = 1.6
| totalv16  = 4.10

| title17   = Duet
| date17    = March 21, 2017
| rs17      = 1.0/4
| viewers17 = 2.71
| dvr17     = 0.8
| dvrv17    = 1.88
| total17   = 1.8
| totalv17  = 4.59

| title18   = Abra Kadabra
| date18    = March 28, 2017
| rs18      = 0.9/3
| viewers18 = 2.39
| dvr18     = 0.7
| dvrv18    = 1.67
| total18   = 1.6
| totalv18  = 4.06

| title19   = The Once and Future Flash
| date19    = April 25, 2017
| rs19      = 1.0/4
| viewers19 = 2.67
| dvr19     = 0.9
| dvrv19    = 1.90
| total19   = 1.9
| totalv19  = 4.57

| title20   = I Know Who You Are
| date20    = May 2, 2017
| rs20      = 1.0/4
| viewers20 = 2.69
| dvr20     = 0.8
| dvrv20    = 1.77
| total20   = 1.8
| totalv20  = 4.46

| title21   = Cause and Effect
| date21    = May 9, 2017
| rs21      = 1.0/4
| viewers21 =  2.71
| dvr21     = 0.9
| dvrv21    = 1.92
| total21   = 1.9
| totalv21  = 4.63

| title22   = Infantino Street
| date22    = May 16, 2017
| rs22      = 0.9/4
| viewers22 = 2.48
| dvr22     = 0.9
| dvrv22    = 1.94
| total22   = 1.8
| totalv22  = 4.42

| title23   = Finish Line
| date23    = May 23, 2017
| rs23      = 1.1/5
| viewers23 = 3.04
| dvr23     = 0.8
| dvrv23    = 1.82
| total23   = 1.9
| totalv23  = 4.86
}}

The season premiere was watched by 3.17 million people and had a 1.3 demo rating, slightly down from the second-season premiere and on par with its second-season finale. The Flash crossover episode, "Invasion!", saw a season three-high viewership of 4.15 million viewers, which was the show's largest since December 9, 2014, and a season three-high 18–49 rating, the highest since February 16, 2016. The third season finished as the 120th ranked show, with an average viewership of 3.50 million. In Canada, the season was the 9th most-watched series in the 18–49 demographic, 8th among adults 18–34, and 14th among adults 25–54 of the 2016–17 television season.

In 2016, according to an analysis from Parrot Analytics, which used ratings data (where available), peer-to-peer sharing, social media chatter, and other factors to estimate viewer demand for various shows, The Flash was the 5th most popular show in the world with 3.1 million demand expressions per day, behind Game of Thrones, The Walking Dead, Pretty Little Liars, and Westworld. From January to July 2017, The Flash was the 7th most popular show in the world with 5.47 million demand expressions per day. Parrot Analytics also noted that the popularity of the show did not slow down during the summer 2017 off-season, saying "It's consistently popular, similar to Game of Thrones, and it appears to be growing in popularity."

 Critical response 
The review aggregator website Rotten Tomatoes reported an 85% approval rating with an average rating of 7.14/10 based on 23 reviews. The website's consensus reads, "Taking its most compelling and emotionally resonant turn to date, The Flash shifts focus in its third season, turning from the grandiose and bizarre toward the characters who inhabit its core universe -- all while remaining action-packed, funny, and dramatic." Metacritic, which uses a weighted average, assigned a score of 80 out of 100 based on 4 critics, indicating "generally favorable reviews".

Jesse Schedeen of IGN rated the season 7.8 out of 10, saying, "The Flash met plenty of speed bumps in Season 3, but a strong finish helped the series persevere in the end." Collider Carla Day lauded the season finale, rating it four stars out of five, but gave the entire season a rating of three stars. J.C. Maçek III of PopMatters rated the season 7 out of 10, saying, "When the show stumbles, the overarching story arc of the season keeps things going and keeps us interested [...] The show remains interesting and fun enough -- without being too lightweight -- to sustain another season and another cliffhanger."

 Accolades The Flash was ranked 8th on The Salt Lake Tribune Top TV Shows of 2016 list. Comic Book Resources named "Flashpoint" and "Invasion!" as the 7th and 16th, respectively, best episodes in 2016 among comic book-related television series. SyfyWire named the season premiere, "Flashpoint" one of the best television episodes of 2016.

|-
! scope="row" rowspan="1" | 2016
| TVLine's Performer of the Week
| Performance in "Flashpoint"
| Candice Patton
| 
| 
|-
! scope="row" rowspan="14" | 2017
| People's Choice Awards
| Favorite Network TV Sci-Fi/Fantasy
| The Flash| 
| 
|-
| IGN Awards
| Best Action Series
| The Flash| 
| 
|-
| IGN People's Choice Awards
| Best Action Series
| The Flash| 
| 
|-
| Kids' Choice Awards
| Favorite TV Show – Family Show
| The Flash| 
| 
|-
| TVLine's Performer of the Week
| Performance in "Duet"
| Grant Gustin
| 
| 
|-
| MTV Movie & TV Awards
| Best Hero
| Grant Gustin
| 
| 
|-
| BMI Film, TV & Visual Media Awards
| BMI Network Television Music Award
| Blake Neely
| 
| 
|-
| rowspan="3"| Saturn Awards
| Best Superhero Adaption Television Series
| The Flash| 
| 
|-
| Best Actor on Television
| Grant Gustin
| 
| 
|-
| Best Supporting Actress on Television
| Candice Patton
| 
| 
|-
| rowspan="4"| Teen Choice Awards
| Choice Action TV Show
| The Flash''
| 
| 
|-
| Choice Action TV Actor
| Grant Gustin
| 
| 
|-
| rowspan="2" | Choice Action TV Actress
| Candice Patton
| 
| 
|-
| Danielle Panabaker
| 
| 
|-
! scope="row" rowspan="1" | 2018
| Leo Awards
| Best Visual Effects in a Dramatic Series
| Armen V. Kevorkian, Marc Lougee, James Baldanzi, Andranik Taranyan, and Shirak Agresta (for "I Know Who You Are")
| 
| 
|-
|}

Notes

References

General references

External links 
 
 

2016 American television seasons
2017 American television seasons
The Flash (2014 TV series) seasons